Javanmiri-ye Olya (also Romanized as Javānmīrī-ye ‘Olyā) is a village in Posht Tang Rural District, in the Central District of Sarpol-e Zahab County, Kermanshah Province, Iran. At the 2006 census, its population was 207, in 36 families.

References 

Populated places in Sarpol-e Zahab County